In Harm's Way is a 1965 American epic war film produced and directed by Otto Preminger and starring John Wayne, Kirk Douglas and Patricia Neal, with a supporting cast featuring Henry Fonda in a lengthy cameo, Tom Tryon, Paula Prentiss, Stanley Holloway, Burgess Meredith, Brandon deWilde, Jill Haworth, Dana Andrews, and Franchot Tone. Produced with Panavision gear, it was one of the last black-and-white World War II epics, and Wayne's last black-and-white film. The screenplay was written by Wendell Mayes, based on the 1962 novel Harm's Way, by James Bassett.

The film takes place as the U.S. involvement in World War II begins; it recounts the lives of several U.S. naval officers based in Hawaii and their wives or lovers. The title of the film comes from a quote from an American Revolutionary naval commander: 

The film presents a relatively unromantic and realistic picture of the American Navy and its officers from the night of December 6, 1941, through the first year of the U.S. involvement in World War II, complete with bureaucratic infighting among the senior officers and sometimes disreputable private acts by individuals. Its sprawling narrative is typical of Preminger's works in which he examined institutions and the people who run them, such as the American Congress and the Presidency in Advise & Consent, the Catholic Church in The Cardinal and the British Intelligence Service in The Human Factor.

Plot
U.S. Navy Captain Rockwell "Rock" Torrey is a divorced son of a career chief petty officer.  A Naval Academy graduate and career officer himself, Torrey is removed from command of his heavy cruiser for boldly pursuing the enemy but then being torpedoed by a Japanese submarine shortly after the attack on Pearl Harbor. Torrey's executive officer, Commander Paul Eddington, is a wayward sort of career officer who has resigned as a naval aviator and returned to the surface navy because of an unhappy marriage. His wife's numerous affairs and drunken escapades have become the talk of Honolulu, and her death during the Pearl Harbor attack – in the company of an Army Air Corps officer, with whom she just had a wild fling on a local beach – drives Eddington into a bar brawl, a stint in the brig, and exile in a hated land-based logistics command.

After several months of desk duty ashore in Hawaii and recuperation from a broken arm he suffered in the attack on his cruiser, Torrey finds his way into a romance with a divorced Navy Nurse Corps lieutenant named Maggie Haynes, who tells him that his estranged son Jeremiah is now an ensign in the Naval Reserve. A strained visit with Jeremiah brings Torrey in on a South Pacific island-hopping offensive codenamed "Skyhook", which is under command of the overly cautious and micro-managing Vice Admiral B.T. Broderick. On additional information from his roommate, intelligence officer Egan Powell, Torrey guesses that the aim of Skyhook is to capture a strategic island named Levu-Vana, whose central plain would make an ideal airfield for B-17 bomber squadrons. Shortly thereafter, Maggie informs him that her unit is to be shipped out to the same area in preparation for the offensive.

In the summer of 1942, Torrey is promoted to rear admiral and given tactical command of Skyhook, an assignment requiring the same sort of guts and gallantry he previously displayed as commanding officer of his cruiser. He personally selects Paul Eddington to be his Chief of Staff, and infuriates Broderick by immediately planning and executing an operation to overrun Gavabutu, an island to be used as a staging base for the invasion of Levu-Vana. This proves unexpectedly easy as the Japanese have withdrawn their garrisons from Gavabutu. As Torrey turns his attention to Levu-Vana, his attempts to secure more materiel and manpower are frustrated by General Douglas MacArthur's simultaneous and much larger campaign in the Solomon Islands. Reconnaissance aircraft prove especially difficult to come by, and surface combatant forces amount to little more than several cruisers and destroyers, including Torrey's former command.

Meanwhile, Eddington's instability drives him to rape navy nurse Annalee Dohrn who is engaged to Torrey's son. The traumatized nurse, fearing she might be pregnant, commits suicide with an overdose of sleeping pills. As the truth is about to be revealed, Eddington – still a qualified aviator – commandeers a PBJ patrol bomber and flies solo on an unauthorized reconnaissance flight to locate elements of the Japanese fleet. He goes down in a fiery death in a redeeming act of sacrifice, giving advance warning of a large Japanese task force centered around the super-battleship Yamato, on its way to blast Torrey's much smaller force off the islands.

Despite the new seaborne threat, Torrey nevertheless mounts the invasion of Levu-Vana and proceeds with a full attempt to turn back the enemy force. Tragically, his son Jere is killed during a nighttime PT boat action. The following morning sees a pitched surface action off the shores of Levu-Vana, with the Americans drawing first blood and the Yamato decimating much of the U.S. force in response. Severely injured at the height of the battle, Torrey is rescued by his flag lieutenant, William "Mac" McConnell, and is returned to Pearl Harbor aboard a hospital ship under Maggie's devoted care. Expecting to be court-martialed, Torrey is instead congratulated on successfully repelling the Japanese advance and allowing his Marines to take Levu-Vana.

Cast

Uncredited cast

Background and production 
It has been speculated that Wayne's low-key performance was due to the fact that he was seriously ill with lung cancer when the film was made. Shortly after filming ended in September 1964, he was diagnosed with the disease and a month later underwent surgery to remove his entire left lung and two ribs. Co-star Franchot Tone was soon to also develop lung cancer and died of the disease in September 1968.

Many of the non-military costumes and hairstyles worn by the women throughout the film were contemporary to the mid-1960s period during which the film was made, rather than of the early 1940s. This is particularly noticeable at the dance which opens the film. Many of the extras in this scene were, in fact, current active duty military officers and their spouses assigned to various commands on Oahu.

The film was shot in black-and-white by Loyal Griggs, who composed his scenes in a wide-screen Panavision format often using deep focus. Griggs was nominated for a Best Cinematographer Academy Award for his work. Jerry Goldsmith's musical score is also notable, as is the work of Saul Bass in the credit titles sequence (this sequence actually comes at the very end of the film, an interesting departure from the then norm in a major Hollywood production at the time).

The film received extensive cooperation from the U.S. Department of Defense, especially the U.S. Navy and the U.S. Marine Corps, with substantial filming occurring both aboard warships at sea and ashore at Naval Station Pearl Harbor (to include Ford Island) and Marine Corps Air Station Kaneohe Bay.

One of many problems encountered during production was that at the time of the filming (mid and late 1964), very few ships then in active Navy service resembled their World War II configuration of two decades earlier. All of the destroyers had to have their modern (1960s) anti-submarine warfare (ASW) gear covered over with fake gun-mounts or deck houses. Additional smaller vessels were provided in support, as well as an HU-16 Albatross amphibious aircraft painted in World War II markings, even though said aircraft did not enter the U.S. military inventory until 1949. The HU-16 likely substitutes for a PBY Catalina, of which no flyable examples were likely available for the film schedule at that time.

Another anachronism is the widespread use of the M151 light utility vehicle as a World War II jeep instead of the World War II-era Willys MB and/or Ford GPA, the M151 having not even entered production until 1959. Also used were a few 1950s vintage 63-ft U.S. Coast Guard rescue launches that were made over to resemble Elco 80-ft PT boats, as the few that existed were not available for use.

Reference near the start of the film is mentioned to the "picket destroyer Ward" dropping depth charges what she believes to be a submarine near the entrance to Pearl Harbor. The incident appears in the 1970 film Tora! Tora! Tora!. USS Ward was sunk by kamikaze action in December 1944.

Reception
In Harm's Way was nominated for the 1965 Academy Award for Cinematography (Black-and-White) for cinematographer Loyal Griggs. It was also screened at the 1965 Cannes Film Festival, but was not entered into the main competition.

Patricia Neal received a 1966 BAFTA Film Award as Best Foreign Actress for her performance in the film.

Critical response
The film received mixed reviews from critics. The film holds a 33% rating on Rotten Tomatoes, based on 15 reviews. Bosley Crowther of The New York Times panned the film, observing, "This is a slick and shallow picture that Mr. Preminger puts forth here, a straight, cliché-crowded melodrama of naval action in the Pacific in World War II ..." and characterized it as "a film that is virtually awash with flimsy and flamboyant fellows with all the tricks of the trade of Hollywood." However, other reviews have been more positive. Bruce Eder, writing for Allmovie.com, notes that ' In Harm's Way has endured extraordinarily well for an epic war movie made in the 1960s, owing to a multitude of virtues. For starters, it was the last big-budget, all-star Hollywood movie to be shot in black-and-white, and that gives the film a harder, sharper, more defined edge than it ever could have had if it had been photographed in color...Add to those virtues the unexpectedly lively pacing and stunning special effects...and In Harm's Way seems like a very fast-moving two and a half hours'.

See also
 List of American films of 1965
 John Wayne filmography

References

External links
 
 
 
 

1965 films
1965 war films
American black-and-white films
American war films
American epic films
Films scored by Jerry Goldsmith
Films based on American novels
Films directed by Otto Preminger
Films set in 1941
Films set in 1942
Films set in Hawaii
Films shot in Hawaii
Paramount Pictures films
Pearl Harbor films
Films with screenplays by Wendell Mayes
Films about the United States Navy in World War II
Films about the United States Marine Corps
Films about rape in the United States
Films about suicide
1960s English-language films
1960s American films
Pacific War films